Portugal selected their entry for the Eurovision Song Contest 1995 through the annual Festival da Canção.

Before Eurovision

Festival da Canção 1995 
Festival da Canção 1995 was the 33rd edition of Festival da Canção that selected Portugal's entry for the Eurovision Song Contest 1995. Eight entries competed in the contest that was held on 7 March 1995 at Cinema Tivoli in Lisbon. The show was hosted by Carlos Mendes, Sofia Morais and Herman José. The winner was chosen by regional juries.

At Eurovision 
On the night of the final Tó Cruz performed 16th in the running order, following United Kingdom and preceding Cyprus. Portugal scored 5 points and placed 21st of the 23 entries.

Voting

References

1995
Countries in the Eurovision Song Contest 1995
Eurovision